Rumen Gabrovski (born 11 June 1946) is a Bulgarian gymnast. He competed in eight events at the 1968 Summer Olympics.

References

External links
 

1946 births
Living people
Bulgarian male artistic gymnasts
Olympic gymnasts of Bulgaria
Gymnasts at the 1968 Summer Olympics
People from Haskovo
Sportspeople from Haskovo Province